The following is a list of prominent people who were born in or have lived in the Malaysian state of Kedah, or for whom Kedah is a significant part of their identity.

==
==

B

C

D

E

F
 Farid Kamil - Malaysian actor, born in Alor Setar

G

H
Hilman Nafis Harusin A.K.A Kedah Jr. Famous Footballer Played For Manchester United
Adib Umair, Hilman Nafis deskmate and friend

I
 Ismail Omar – 9th Inspector-General of Police of Malaysia, born in Kulim

J
 Janna Nick - Malaysian actress and singer, born in Sungai Petani

K
 Khir Johari – politician, born in Alor Setar

L

M
 Mahathir Mohamad – 4th Prime Minister of Malaysia, born in Alor Setar
 Masya Masyitah - Bintang Ceria contestant, born and raised in Kulim. Studied at SMK Chio Min

N

O

P

Q

R

S
 Shahnon Ahmad – writer, National Laureate, born in Sik

T

U

V

W
 Wan Muhd Syahmie Bin Wan Shahar – Ex-teacher, Taekwondo fighter, born in Alor Setar

X

Y
Yuna - International singer, songwriter, born in Alor Setar

Z

References

 
Kedah